Geotrupes (from Greek 'earth-boring') is a genus of earth-boring scarab beetles in the family Geotrupidae. There are at least 30 described species in Geotrupes.

Species
These 31 species belong to the genus Geotrupes:

 Geotrupes atavus Oustalet, 1874 c g
 Geotrupes baicalicus Reitter, 1892 c g
 Geotrupes balyi Jekel, 1865 i g b (Baly's earth boring beetle)
 Geotrupes blackburnii (Fabricius, 1781) i b (Blackburn's earth boring beetle)
 Geotrupes cavicollis Bates, 1887 i
 Geotrupes corinthius Fairmaire, 1886 c g
 Geotrupes douei Gory, 1841 c g
 Geotrupes egeriei Germar, 1824 i b (Eger's earth boring beetle)
 Geotrupes folwarcznyi Cervenka, 2005 c g
 Geotrupes genestieri Boucomont, 1904 c g
 Geotrupes germari Heer, 1862 c g
 Geotrupes hornii Blanchard, 1888 i g b (Horn's earth boring beetle)
 Geotrupes ibericus Baraud, 1958 c g
 Geotrupes jakowlewi (Semenov, 1891) c
 Geotrupes kashmirensis Sharp, 1878 c g
 Geotrupes koltzei Reitter, 1892 c g
 Geotrupes lenardoi Petrovitz, 1973 c g
 Geotrupes meridionalis (Palisot De Beauvois, 1805) c g
 Geotrupes messelensis Meunier, 1921 c g
 Geotrupes mutator (Marsham, 1802) c g
 Geotrupes olgae Olsoufieff, 1918 c g
 Geotrupes opacus Haldeman, 1853 i b (opaque earth boring beetle)
 Geotrupes rottensis Statz, 1952 c g
 Geotrupes semiopacus Jekel, 1865 i b
 Geotrupes spiniger (Marsham, 1802) c g
 Geotrupes splendidulus (Fabricius, 1775) i g
 Geotrupes splendidus g b (splendid earth boring beetle)
 Geotrupes stercorarius (Linnaeus, 1758) i c g b (dor beetle)
 Geotrupes thoracinus (Palisot De Beauvois, 1805) c g
 Geotrupes ulkei Blanchard, 1888 i g b (Ulke's earth boring beetle)
 Geotrupes vetustus Germar, 1837 c g

Data sources: i = ITIS, c = Catalogue of Life, g = GBIF, b = Bugguide.net

References

Further reading

External links

 

Geotrupidae
Scarabaeoidea genera
Taxa named by Pierre André Latreille